The South African Women's Open is a golf tournament. It was first played in 1988, is sanctioned by the Women's PGA of South Africa and is played as part of the Sunshine Ladies Tour. The tournament has been co-sanctioned by the Ladies European Tour 2012–2014 and from 2018.

The title sponsor is Investec and the host sponsor is the City of Cape Town.

Winners

References

External links

List of winners
Coverage on the Ladies European Tour's official site

Ladies European Tour events
Sunshine Ladies Tour events
Golf tournaments in South Africa
Recurring sporting events established in 1988